The 1995 Interplay Mosconi Cup, the second edition of the annual nine-ball pool competition between teams representing Europe and the United States, took place 7–10 December 1995 at the Festival Hall in Basildon, England.

Team Europe won the Mosconi Cup by defeating Team USA 16–15.

Teams

Results

Thursday, 7 December

Session 1

Session 2

Friday, 8 December

Session 3

Session 4

Saturday, 9 December

Session 5

Session 6

Sunday, 10 December

Session 7

Session 8

References

External links
 Official homepage

1995
1995 in cue sports
1995 in English sport
1995 Mosconi Cup
December 1995 sports events in the United Kingdom